Qingdao Airport railway station is a railway station in Jiaozhou, Qingdao, Shandong, China. It is connected to Qingdao Jiaodong International Airport.

History
On 9 August 2021, the railway station on Jinan–Qingdao high-speed railway opened.

References
 

Railway stations in Shandong
Airport railway stations in China
Railway stations in China opened in 2021